Nandana is an Indian actress who handled lead roles and supporting roles during the 2000s in Malayalam and Tamil films. She made her cinematic debut with the Malayalam movie Snehithan  in 2002.

Personal life
She hails from Thiruvannur, Kozhikode. She married actor Manoj Bharathiraja, son of Tamil director P Bharathiraja, on 19 November 2006. He was her co-star in the film Saadhuriyan.  She retired from film industry after marriage. They have two daughters, Arthika and Mathivadani. Malayalam actress Anjali Nair is her first cousin.

Partial filmography

Advertisements
 Shreedevi Textiles

References

External links

Actresses in Malayalam cinema
Indian film actresses
Actresses in Tamil cinema
Actresses from Kozhikode
Living people
Place of birth missing (living people)
1985 births
21st-century Indian actresses